Centre-left politics lean to the left on the left–right political spectrum but are closer to the centre than other left-wing politics. Those on the centre-left believe in working within the established systems to improve social justice. The centre-left promotes a degree of social equality that it believes is achievable through promoting equal opportunity. The centre-left emphasizes that the achievement of equality requires personal responsibility in areas in control by the individual person through their abilities and talents as well as social responsibility in areas outside control by the person in their abilities or talents.

The centre-left opposes a wide gap between the rich and the poor and supports moderate measures to reduce the economic gap, such as a progressive income tax, laws prohibiting child labour, minimum wage laws, laws regulating working conditions, limits on working hours and laws to ensure the workers' right to organize. The centre-left typically claims that complete equality of outcome is not possible, but instead that equal opportunity improves a degree of equality of outcome in society.

In Europe, the centre-left includes social democrats, progressives, greens and the moderate Christian left. Some variants of liberalism, especially social liberalism, are described as centre-left, but many social liberals are in the centre of the political spectrum as well. In the Americas, in relation to economic policy, the center-left also includes economic progressive forms of Christian democracy, some of which may be politically syncretic mixing in the social conservatism of the center-right.

Ideologies 
The main ideologies of the centre-left are social democracy, social liberalism, democratic socialism, progressivism, green politics, and human rights advocacy. Some centre-left groups can be described as libertarian.

Social democracy is a reformist offshoot of socialism that supports the modification of capitalist economies rather than their total abolition. It has historically been most successful in the European Union. Sweden in particular has historically been closely associated with social democracy, as it was the first country to be led by a social democratic party and social democrats in Sweden continued to be relevant even after the ideology lost influence in other countries during the 1970s.

Third Way politics is a branch of centre-left politics that developed near the end of the 20th century. It supports heavy deregulation and privatization for the purpose of increasing economic growth to fund public goods such as education, healthcare, and pensions.

Positions 
Throughout the world, centre-left groups generally support:
 A system of social security, with the stated goal of counteracting the effects of poverty and insuring the general public against loss of income following illness, unemployment or retirement (national insurance contributions).
 Government bodies that regulate private enterprise in the interests of workers and consumers by ensuring labor and consumer rights (e.g. supporting worker access to trade unions, workers participation, consumer protections and fair market competition).
 A system of progressive taxation that includes tax breaks and subsidies for those under poverty extended from government.
 A value-added tax (or occasionally a wealth tax) to fund government expenditures.
 Government investments and spending, for example in public works and Keynesian economics.

The term may be used to imply positions on the environment, religion, public morality, etc., but these are usually not the defining characteristics, since centre-right parties may sometimes take similar positions on these issues. A centre-left party may or may not be more concerned with reducing industrial emissions than a centre-right party if not explicitly adhering to a green ideology.

Economics 
Centre-left groups generally support a mixed economy with moderate economic interventionism. Keynesian economics has historically seen support among the centre-left, though it has declined in popularity in favour of balanced budgets and low government spending. Closely related to centre-left politics are concepts of the welfare state and regulated labour markets. Proponents of centre-left economic policy often support the use of transfer payment systems, such as welfare and early childhood education, with the goal of creating higher employment while avoiding a welfare trap.

Some early centre-left groups supported gradual reform toward socialism, but this position is not supported by the centre-left in the 21st century. The modern centre-left distinguishes between just and unjust capitalism, advocating for welfare state policies to create what it considers to be just capitalism. The core objective underlying centre-left economic policies, democratic capitalism, has largely been achieved within many economies, with further policies seeking to merely reform or improve upon this system. These may include measures to reduce poverty or to support lower-wage workers. One common dispute within the centre-left is the extent to which centre-left parties should reform markets versus regulating pre-existing markets. Centre-left parties in Europe and the United States have supported corporate governance reform to protect the investments of shareholders.

The economies of Nordic countries such as Denmark and Sweden are often upheld by proponents of centre-left economic policies as successful applications of these policies. These economies heavily emphasize international trade as well as collaboration between government, industry, and labour.

Immigration 
The immigration policies of centre-left groups vary depending on the political circumstances of a given country, and they may seek to greatly expand or greatly restrict immigration. The key issue of centre-left immigration policy is the balance between egalitarianism and pragmatism. The centre-left often faces pressures from working class voters to restrict immigration to prevent competition over jobs and public services. Other centre-left policies can also be negatively impacted by immigration, as a large increase in low-skilled workers can raise concerns about the increased price of public services, prompting spending cuts and roll-backs of centre-left welfare policies.

History

Origins 
The centre-left is descended from left-wing politics, which originated in the French Revolution and in the response to early capitalism. Academia is divided on when the term "centre-left" came out. Scholars  believe that it mainly appeared between the Bourbon Restoration (1814–1830) and the July Monarchy (1830–1848), a political-historical phase during the Kingdom of France reigned under an almost parliamentary system. During this period, the centre-left mainly showed Liberal Party and Movement Party. The Republicans was classified as left to far-left. the Third Party and the conservative-liberal Doctrinaires is centrist. Resistance Party was classified as centre-right and Ultra-royalists as right to far-right.

During this time, the centre-left was led by Adolphe Thiers (head of the liberal-nationalist Movement Party) and Odilon Barrot, who headed the populist "Dynastic Opposition". The centre-left was Orléanist, but supported a liberal interpretation of the Charter of 1830, more power to the Parliament, manhood suffrage and support to rising European nationalisms. Adolphe Thiers served as Prime Minister for King Louis Philippe I twice (in 1836 and 1840), but he then lost the King's favour, and the centre-left rapidly fell.

In France, during the Second Republic and the Second Empire the centre-left was not strong or organized, but became commonly associated with the moderate republicans' group in Parliament. Finally, in 1871 the Second Empire fell as consequence of the French defeat in the Franco-Prussian War and Adolphe Thiers re-established the centre-left after the foundation of the Third Republic. This time the centre-left was constituted of moderate republicans, then called "Opportunists", anti-royalist liberals and radicals from the Republican Union. During the Third Republic, the centre-left was led by political and intellectual figures like Jules Dufaure, Édouard René de Laboulaye, Charles de Rémusat, Léon Say, William Waddington, Jean Casimir-Perier, Edmond Henri Adolphe Schérer and Georges Picot.

Elsewhere in Europe, centre-left movements appeared from the 1860s, mainly in Spain and Italy. In Italy, the centre-left was born as coalition between the liberal Camillo Benso, Count of Cavour and the progressive Urbano Rattazzi, the heads respectively of the Right and Left groupings in Parliament. This alliance was called "connubio" ("marriage") for its opportunist characteristics. In the 1900s, centre-left positions were expressed by people and parties who believed in social democracy and democratic socialism, but also some liberals or Christian-democrats were associated with the centre-left. Currently, the centre-left parties in Europe are united in the social democratic Party of European Socialists and ecologist European Green Party.

The prevalence of the position occurred mainly due to the rise of socialism caused Liberals to move away from laissez-faire policies to more interventionist policies, which created the New Liberal movement. New liberalism (or social liberalism), along with moderate socialism, is regarded as a representative modern centre-left ideology.

Early 20th century 
Social democracy developed by the early 20th century as a response to the strength of capitalism. Challenging the idea that capitalism was nearing an implosion, reformist socialists such as Eduard Bernstein rejected Marxist ideas of historical materialism and class conflict, and social democrats established themselves as a reformist alternative to the revolutionary left, arguing that societal improvements within capitalist democracy would better serve the working class. This philosophy became widely popular among the European left after World War I, which convinced many contemporary leftists that national identity was more important to the working class than class solidarity, which would render Marxism unviable. This was reinforced by the wave of democracy that followed, allowing socialists to participate in electoral politics.

Social democrats made up the centre-left during the interwar period in Europe, advocating for government regulation and intervention in opposition to the passive policies of the predominant Marxist and classical liberal parties. They opted for appeals to the common good rather than to the working class or individualism. In Western Europe, the centre-left supported the Plan De Man. Following the Great Depression in the 1930s, state intervention saw popular support throughout the western world. The centre-left was particularly strong in Sweden, which was the only country at the time to have ruling party that was explicitly social democratic, the Swedish Social Democratic Party. The Democratic Party in the United States also implemented centre-left policies with the New Deal, as a lack of ties to socialist groups allowed for greater support.

Post-war politics 
Centre-left ideas proliferated rapidly after the Great Depression and World War II. A post-war consensus formed among policymakers in Western Europe that rejected both classical liberalism and democratic socialism in favour of social democratic ideals.

Keynesian economics declined in popularity after the end of the post-war consensus and the subsequent recession in the 1970s. The centre-left parties that had held power to that point received much of the blame for the economic crises, and support for the centre-left declined in favour of conservative neoliberalism. At the same time, the end of several right-wing dictatorships in Southern Europe prompted support for centre-left politics in the 1970s. A decline in the relevance of trade unions, historically a prominent voter group for social democratic parties, contributed to the limited success of centre-left politics in the 1980s. Furthermore, centre-left policies faced new challenges that necessitated a reconsideration of the welfare state, including population ageing that threatened pension programs and women in the workforce that heavily altered the job market.

Late 20th and early 21st centuries 
Third Way politics developed as a prominent form of centre-left politics, beginning with the Australian governments of Bob Hawke and Paul Keating in the 1980s and 1990s. Similar movements developed elsewhere, including in Germany and New Zealand. The most prominent adoption of Third Way politics was that of New Labour in the United Kingdom. Centre-left politics remained unpopular in much of Continental Europe at this time.

Centre-left ideologies were among those uplifted by the pink tide in Latin America in the late 1990s. Prior to this, left-wing politics were incredibly unpopular in the region. Early centre-left politics in Latin America focused heavily on the inclusion of previously excluded groups in society. Income inequality became a major focus, and centre-left parties in the region promoted redistributive policy. Several centre-left parties supported reforms toward economic liberalism in line with those supported by their right-wing counterparts, in some cases leading to backlash that saw incumbent centre-left leaders replaced by far-left populists. 

By the beginning of the 21st century, the centre-left had almost entirely overtaken farther left groups in politics globally, with other forms of left-wing politics seeing little support in democratic nations. Globalization and the Digital Revolution altered the objectives and demographics of the centre-left, as the working class has been largely subsumed by the middle class in developed nations due to increased living standards and the establishment of a knowledge economy. In particular, People's Parties based on mass mobilization proved to be less viable.

These rapid developments in society during the turn of the century caused distress among voters, including increased perceptions of social inequality and fear of change, causing voters to move away from traditional centre-left ideologies toward populism. The Great Recession exacerbated this trend, bringing significant challenges to the rule of centre-left parties, particularly those with social democratic leanings. In Europe, this brought about a period of Pasokification in which social democratic parties saw large declines during the 2010s, largely being replaced by far-left and right-wing populist parties. In some cases, centre-left and centre-right politics in these countries became less distinct as political cleavages shifted toward populist versus traditional politics.

See also 

 Centrism
 Centre-right politics
 Eco-capitalism
 Georgism
 Green liberalism
 Green libertarianism
 List of left-wing political parties
 Neoclassical liberalism
 Social market economy
 Soft left
 Third Way
 Welfare capitalism

References

Bibliography 

 
 
 
 
 
 
 
 
 

Centrism
Left-wing politics
Political spectrum
Political terminology